Nehru is a 1984 Indian english language documentary film based on the life of Jawaharlal Nehru, the first Prime Minister of independent Republic of India. The film is directed by Shyam Benegal and Yuri Aldokhin, and produced by Films Division of India in collaboration with Center-Nauch-Film Studios, and Sovin Films, Russia with Yash Chaudhary as the executive producer. The film won the inaugural Best Historical Reconstruction and Compilation Film at the 32nd National Film Awards.

Awards
National Film Awards
Best Historical Reconstruction and Compilation Film (1985).

See also
Tryst with Destiny (1947 speech)
The light has gone out of our lives (1948 speech)
Our Prime Minister (1957 film)
Three weeks in the life of Prime Minister Nehru (1962 film)

References

External links

1984 films
1980s English-language films
Indian documentary films
Films directed by Shyam Benegal
Indian biographical films
Indian political films
Indian Independence Movement
Indian independence movement fiction
Cultural depictions of Jawaharlal Nehru
Cultural depictions of prime ministers of India
Indian independence movement
Films set in the Indian independence movement
National Film Award (India) winners